Anthony Charles Golab,  (January 17, 1919 – October 16, 2016) was a Canadian football halfback and flying wing who played in the Ontario Rugby Football Union and Interprovincial Rugby Football Union for 11 years with the Sarnia Imperials, Ottawa Rough Riders, and Ottawa Uplands. He was born in Windsor, Ontario.

Golab played with the Ottawa Rough Riders from 1939 to 1950. He was part of the 1939, 1941, and 1948 Grey Cup finalist teams and was part of the winning 1940 Grey Cup champions. He was an Eastern All-Star at halfback in 1938, 1940, and 1945 and at flying wing in 1947 and 1948.

In 1964, he was elected to the Canadian Football Hall of Fame. In 1975, he was inducted into Canada's Sports Hall of Fame. In 1985, he was made a Member of the Order of Canada. In 1997, he was inducted into the Ontario Sports Hall of Fame. He died at the Perley Veterans Health Centre in Ottawa, Ontario in October 2016 at the age of 97.

References 
Citations

Sources

1919 births
2016 deaths
Canadian Football Hall of Fame inductees
Members of the Order of Canada
Montreal Alouettes general managers
Ontario Rugby Football Union players
Ottawa Rough Riders players
Players of Canadian football from Ontario
Academic staff of the Royal Military College of Canada
Sportspeople from Windsor, Ontario
20th-century Canadian people